Cornegliano Laudense is a comune (municipality) in the Province of Lodi in the Italian region Lombardy, located about  southeast of Milan and about  west of Lodi.

Cornegliano Laudense borders the following municipalities: Lodi, Lodi Vecchio, San Martino in Strada, Pieve Fissiraga, Massalengo.

References

External links
  Official website

Cities and towns in Lombardy